The 2021–22 Eliteserien (known as the REMA 1000-ligaen for sponsorship reasons) was the 57th season of the Eliteserien, the top men's handball league in Norway. A total of fourteen teams contested this season's league, which began on 31 August  2021 and concluded on 11 June 2022. 

Elverum won their sixth title.

Teams

Arenas and locations
The following 14 clubs competed in the Eliteserien during the 2021–22 season:

Regular season

League table

Playoffs
Quarterfinals were played best-of-three format, semifinals and finals were played best-of-five.

Quarterfinals

|}

Semifinals

|}

Finals

|}

Game 1

Game 2

Game 3

Game 4

''Elverum won the Finals, 3–1 on series.

References

External links
Norwegian Handball Federation 

Handball competitions in Norway
Norway
Handball
Handball